The Circus (Spanish: El circo) is a 1943 Mexican comedy film directed by Miguel M. Delgado and starring Cantinflas and Gloria Lynch.

Plot summary

Cast
 Cantinflas as El Zapatero 
 Gloria Lynch as Rosalinda  
 Estanislao Shilinsky as Maestro de ceremonias  
 Eduardo Arozamena as Coronel  
 Ángel T. Sala as Don Elías  
 Rafael Burglete 
 Tito Novaro as Ricardo  
 Leonid Kinskey as Cliente ruso zapatero 
 Julio Ahuet
 Arcady Boytler 
 Manuel Dondé
 Pedro Elviro
 Edmundo Espino
 Juan García
 Ana María Hernández as Espectadora circo  
 Alfonso Jiménez 
 Guillermo Meneses
 Roberto Y. Palacios as Cliente zapatero  
 Ignacio Peón as Espectador circo  
 Charles Rooner as Mr. Arnold

References

Bibliography 
 Eric Zolov. Iconic Mexico: An Encyclopedia from Acapulco to Zócalo. ABC-CLIO, 2015.

External links 
 

1943 films
1943 comedy films
Mexican comedy films
1940s Spanish-language films
Films directed by Miguel M. Delgado
Mexican black-and-white films
Circus films
1940s Mexican films